Carols by Candlelight  is an annual Australian Christmas tradition that  was popularised in Melbourne in 1938. The tradition has since spread around the world. It involves people gathering, usually outdoors in a park, to sing carols by candlelight, featuring live performances by both national and international celebrities accompanied by a symphony orchestra.

Vision Australia's Carols by Candlelight 
Vision Australia's Carols by Candlelight is the oldest Carols by Candlelight event in Australia.

History 
Carols by Candlelight, held in Melbourne, Victoria, was introduced in 1938 by radio announcer Norman Banks, of Melbourne radio station 3KZ. Whilst walking home from his night-time radio shift on Christmas Eve in 1937, he passed a window and saw an elderly woman sitting up in bed inside listening to Away in a Manger being played on the radio and singing along with her face being lit by candlelight. Wondering how many others spent Christmas alone, he had the idea to gather a large group of people to all sing Christmas carols together by candlelight. The first ever event was held in Alexandra Gardens the following Christmas in 1938, and was attended by around 10,000 people.

Following World War II, the Carols became so well patronised that the decision was made to move it to the neighbouring park in Kings Domain. In 1959, the newly constructed Sidney Myer Music Bowl provided a permanent venue, where they are still held 60 years on as of 2019.

Funds raised from donations, ticket, and candle sales are given to Vision Australia (formerly the Royal Victorian Institute for the Blind, (RVIB)). However, originally, all profits went to the Austin Hospital. During World War II the Red Cross and the Australian Comforts Fund joined the Austin Hospital as co-recipients, and in the immediate post-war era the RVIB received funds, as did the Austin Hospital.

In recent years, the dress rehearsal on 23 December has become open to the public. Tickets to the event are cheaper than the main event, while funds raised still go towards Vision Australia. The event has become almost as popular as the main event in recent years.

Due to the ongoing COVID-19 pandemic, there were no crowds for the 2020 event; it was the first time no crowds were allowed since its 1938 inception. Crowds were allowed in 2021, but all attendees (10,000 people) needed to have had the COVID vaccination.

Hosts and broadcast
The event was originally hosted by its founder Melbourne sports broadcaster Norman Banks and broadcast live over radio station 3KZ.

The 1956 Carols By Candlelight was the first to be broadcast on television, as part of GTV9's pre-launch test transmission, with 3KZ maintaining a separate radio broadcast of the event.

When Banks left 3KZ in 1952, Philip Gibbs became host. During the time that Gibbs was hosting, the program became a radio/TV simulcast on 3KZ and ATV-0, with ATV-0's first telecast in 1969, extending to other stations across the 0-10 Network (now Network Ten). From 1979 it was telecast nationally through the Nine Network. Later radio broadcast partners included 3MP, 3AW and 3EE and across the Macquarie Radio Network as well as Vision Australia's own national radio network.
The event was also previously linked to Ray Martin, who hosted the carols for 18 years.
The event is also broadcast and telecast live to eastern Asia, many Pacific Islands and New Zealand.

Performers 
Performers for the event vary from year to year. Regular performers include David Hobson, Marina Prior, Silvie Paladino, Denis Walter, Vanessa Amorosi,  and Anthony Callea. Australian children's band Hi-5 headlined children's segments in recent years. Nine Network stars and contestants from The Voice Australia have also starred in the event in recent years.

The Vision Australia's Carols by Candlelight Choir, Australian Girls Choir and National Boys Choir of Australia appear on the show each year as supporting acts in numerous of the performances.

In 1938 the massed choirs were led by Horace Stevens, who was followed in the position by Max Balderson. The long-serving musical director from 1984 to 2002 was Geoff Harvey.Since 2003, John Foreman has filled the position.

In earlier years, Carols by Candlelight had a strong classical music theme, and a noticeable religious influence. The Sun Aria winner for each year was automatically invited to sing at Carols by Candlelight. However, since the 1960s, the program has certainly moved towards popular culture.

Ray Martin holds the record for hosting the most Carols by Candlelight shows, from 1989 to 2007. He sang at only one show, in 1996, when he sang Harry Connick Jr's "When My Heart Finds Christmas".

Other carols events
Most cities and towns in Australia hold a night-time carols event in the lead up to Christmas.

Sydney 
Carols in the Domain have been held annually since 1983, originally on the last Saturday evening before Christmas Eve, and on the last Sunday evening before Christmas Eve since 2016. They are televised in Australia and sometimes in other countries.

Brisbane
Carols in the City is held on Riverstage in the Brisbane Botanic Gardens and on television throughout Queensland.

Perth
In Perth, Carols by Candlelight are held in mid December at the Supreme Court Gardens, while other events are held at Fremantle, Scarborough and Rockingham. In 2012, Suzie Mathers performed during the IGA Carols by Candlelight in Perth

Adelaide
In Adelaide, Carols by Candlelight is held in the weeks before Christmas in Elder Park on the banks of the River Torrens. In 2012, 30,000 people witnessed the event.

In the Adelaide suburb of Modbury, the annual Civic Park Carols attracts the second biggest crowd of its type (community) in Australia with about 40,000 people attending the seventh edition in 2018.

Hobart
In Hobart, due to the urban nature of the city, there are three main carols services. One each in Clarence, Glenorchy and the main ceremony is held in the Royal Tasmanian Botanical Gardens by Variety - the Children's Charity of Tasmania.

Canberra
In Canberra the annual Carols by Candlelight is held in Commonwealth Park on Stage 88. 2019 will be its 75th occurrence. This is the second longest runnings Carols in a capital city. It is a traditional Carols with community singing of carols led by Woden Valley Youth Choir and one of the local bands such as Canberra City Band.  Guest Artists are featured - usually drawn from the local community.  Donations are collected for a local charity with $14,180 raised in 2012 for the Snowy Hydro Southcare Helicopter service. In 2011 Auslan interpreters started to provide interpretation for members of the regional deaf community

Darwin
Carols by Candlelight is held at the George Brown Darwin Botanic Gardens each year, raising money for charity.

Around Victoria
Carols in the Park is held annually in North Balwyn. In 2011 it moved to Macleay Park, North Balwyn. In 2012, 10,000 people attended the celebration in Victoria.
Carols at Como Park is held annually in South Yarra by the City of Stonnington. 
Denis Walter's Carols by the Bay is held on the first Saturday of December in Geelong. It is held at Eastern Beach and is a free event.
The City of Monash organises the large annual Carols by Candlelight event in Jells Park, hosted by Pete Smith. It has attracted up to 25,000 people and has been running for over 25 years.
 In the City of Yarra a large Carols by Candlelight event has recently been held in the Abbotsford Convent gardens.
 In the City of Manningham a large Carols by Candlelight event is held annually in Ruffey Lake Park.
 In Werribee, there is the annual City of Wyndham Carols held on the lawns at the historic Werribee Mansion. This event takes place on the second week of December.

Other 
 In Newcastle, New South Wales, Carols by Candlelight are held in mid-December at King Edward Park in the city near the beach.
 In the City of Lake Macquarie, Carols are held each year at Speers Point Park in mid-December on the edge of Lake Macquarie.

See also
 Christian music in Australia

References

External links
Vision Australia official site
Carols by Candlelight had lonely beginning (Includes further information on Norman Banks)
Council Conflicts over carols by candlelight at ABC News Australia Retrieved 27 April 2013
Woden Valley Youth Choir website

Nine Network specials
Christmas festivals
Television shows set in Melbourne
Christianity in Australia
1938 establishments in Australia
Recurring events established in 1938
Summer events in Australia